Bixad is a commune in Covasna County, Transylvania, Romania. Composed of a single village, Bixad, it was joined to Malnaș in 1968. It once again became an independent commune when it split off in 2004. It lies in the Székely Land, an ethno-cultural region in eastern Transylvania.

Demographics
The commune has an absolute Székely Hungarian majority. According to the 2011 Census it has a population of 1,774 of which 97.01% or 1,721 are Hungarian.

Tourist attractions
Mikes Armin school which was the hunting lodge of the Mikes family and built by Count Ármin Mikes around 1900. Apart from the school, the building hosts a little museum displaying glass from the factory which was operated by the Mikó and later the Mikes family in the village until 1918.
The so-called Mikes Spas: the Vallato, the Hammas and the Bükki Spa.

References

Communes in Covasna County
Localities in Transylvania